Dendrobium hasseltii, commonly known as the Hasselt's dendrobium or spinach orchid, is a species of orchid. It is native to Borneo, Java, Sumatra, and Peninsular Malaysia.

References

hasseltii
Orchids of Malaya
Flora of Peninsular Malaysia
Orchids of Borneo
Orchids of Java
Orchids of Malaysia
Orchids of Sumatra
Plants described in 1825
Taxa named by Carl Ludwig Blume